George Warrender may refer to:

Sir George Warrender, 1st Baronet (c. 1658–1721), Lord Provost, Member of Parliament for Edinburgh
Sir George Warrender, 4th Baronet (1782–1849), Member of Parliament for Haddington Burghs, Truro, Sandwich, Westbury and Honiton
Sir George Warrender, 7th Baronet (1860–1917), Vice-Admiral in the British Royal Navy